WBZA (98.9 FM) is an adult hits station in Rochester, New York. It is owned by Audacy, Inc. (formerly Entercom Communications), who purchased the station from Sinclair Broadcasting in 1999. Before its current format, the station played oldies as WBBF (and before that, WKLX) before that station moved to a lower-powered station broadcasting on 93.3 FM.  The station's studios are located at High Falls Studios downtown, and its transmitter tower is on Rochester's west side.

History
The 98.9 frequency in Rochester has been in continuous use since 1947. Before signing on at its current frequency, the direct predecessor of WBZA, then known as WHFM, broadcast in the old 42-50 MHz FM band. Founded as a sister station to WHAM by Stromberg-Carlson, its daily operation dates back to 1939, making it one of the very oldest surviving FM stations in the United States.

As WHFM, the programming format was top 40/CHR from the late 1960s until early 1985. In early 1985 the call letters were changed to WZKC, and the format changed to country music. In the summer of 1986 both format and call letters were changed again, with WKLX adopting a classic hits format (primarily rock music from the mid-1960s to the mid-1970s). In April 1988, the format was changed to "classic oldies" (pop music from the mid-1950s to early 1970s) and at the same time the transmitter site was relocated into the city of Rochester. It took on the WBBF call sign in 1998.

In November 2000, WBBF's intellectual property moved to then-sister station 93.3 FM, and 98.9 flipped to all-80s hits as "The Buzz." This continued until 2004, when it shifted to classic rock, while retaining the "Buzz" moniker. With the demise of hard rock station WNVE in 2007, WBZA shifted from classic rock to mainstream rock at roughly the same time when Entercom purchased classic rock station WCMF-FM from CBS Radio. In 2014, the station shifted back toward adult hits, changing its slogan from "All Kinds of Rock" to "Playing Everything, All the Time."

Morning shows 
The Kimberly & Beck show (hosted by Kimberly Rae and Barry Beck) aired in morning drive until 2014. The duo were fired after making controversial comments about transgender people. The duo moved to WAIO later in 2014, and were fired from that station in 2020 after making racist comments.

Since September 2014, the Spezzano & Sandy show has aired in mornings on WBZA. The show previously aired for 25 years on sister-station WPXY.

Callsign history 
The callsign had been that of WBZ's sister station in Boston, which was established in 1924; the callsign was switched with the original station in Springfield, Massachusetts in 1931, which carried a simulcast of the original WBZ until it went dark in 1962.  Following the closure of WBZA in Springfield, the call letters were assigned to an AM station in Glens Falls, New York.  That incarnation of WBZA broadcast on 1410 kHz with 1,000 watts of power.  The station had signed on in 1959 with the call letters WSET.

References

External links

BZA
Audacy, Inc. radio stations
Adult hits radio stations in the United States
Radio stations established in 1946
1946 establishments in New York (state)